Matthijs Christian Brouwer (born 1 July 1980 in Raamsdonk, North Brabant) is a field hockey player from the Netherlands, who won the silver medal with the Dutch national team at the 2004 Summer Olympics in Athens. The striker made his debut on 2 June 2000 in a friendly match against Spain. He played for HC Den Bosch in the Dutch League (Hoofdklasse), but moved to Oranje Zwart in the summer of 2005. His cousin Ronald also is a member of the Netherlands hockey squad.

External links
 
 Profile on Athens 2004-website

1980 births
Living people
Dutch male field hockey players
Male field hockey forwards
Olympic field hockey players of the Netherlands
2002 Men's Hockey World Cup players
Field hockey players at the 2004 Summer Olympics
2006 Men's Hockey World Cup players
Field hockey players at the 2008 Summer Olympics
Olympic silver medalists for the Netherlands
People from Geertruidenberg
Olympic medalists in field hockey
Medalists at the 2004 Summer Olympics
Oranje Zwart players
HC Den Bosch players
Sportspeople from North Brabant